Miami Valley Golf Club is a golf club located on both sides of the border between Fort McKinley (in Harrison Township, Montgomery County) and Dayton, Ohio, USA. The golf course was designed by Donald Ross. The club was established in 1919. The club hosted the PGA Championship in 1957, which was the last time the competition was played under the matchplay format. Lionel Hebert won the competition beating Dow Finsterwald. The match ended on the par-3 17th, by a margin of 2 & 1.

The club was listed on the National Register of Historic Places in 2015.

External links
Official site

Golf clubs and courses in Ohio
Buildings and structures in Montgomery County, Ohio
Tourist attractions in Montgomery County, Ohio
National Register of Historic Places in Montgomery County, Ohio
Sports venues on the National Register of Historic Places in Ohio
Golf clubs and courses on the National Register of Historic Places
Sports venues completed in 1919
1919 establishments in Ohio